Hungary competed at the 1948 Summer Olympics in Wembley Park, London, England. 128 competitors, 107 men and 21 women, took part in 76 events in 15 sports.

Medalists

|  style="text-align:left; width:78%; vertical-align:top;"|

Default sort order: Medal, Date, Name

| style="text-align:left; width:22%; vertical-align:top;"|

Multiple medalists
The following competitors won multiple medals at the 1948 Olympic Games.

Athletics

Basketball

Boxing

Canoeing

Diving

Fencing

18 fencers, 15 men and 3 women, represented Hungary in 1948.

Men's foil
 Lajos Maszlay
 Endre Palócz
 József Hátszeghy

Men's team foil
 Béla Bay, Aladár Gerevich, József Hátszeghy, Lajos Maszlay, Pál Dunay, Endre Palócz

Men's épée
 Pál Dunay
 Imre Hennyei
 Béla Mikla

Men's team épée
 Imre Hennyei, Pál Dunay, Béla Rerrich, Béla Mikla, Lajos Balthazár, Béla Bay

Men's sabre
 Aladár Gerevich
 Pál Kovács
 Tibor Berczelly

Men's team sabre
 Aladár Gerevich, Tibor Berczelly, Rudolf Kárpáti, Pál Kovács, László Rajcsányi, Bertalan Papp

Women's foil
 Ilona Elek-Schacherer
 Margit Elek
 Éva Kun

Gymnastics

Modern pentathlon

Three male pentathletes represented Hungary in 1948.

 Frigyes Hegedűs
 István Szondy
 László Karácson

Rowing

Hungary had nine male rowers participate in four out of seven rowing events in 1948.

 Men's double sculls
 Sándor Ormándi
 József Simó

 Men's coxed pair
 Antal Szendey
 Béla Zsitnik
 Róbert Zimonyi (cox)

 Men's coxless four
 Miklós Zágon
 Lajos Nagy
 Tibor Nádas
 József Sátori

 Men's coxed four
 Miklós Zágon
 Lajos Nagy
 József Sátori
 Tibor Nádas
 Róbert Zimonyi (cox)

Shooting

Four shooters represented Hungary in 1948. Károly Takács won a gold medal in the 25 metre pistol event.

25 metre pistol
 Károly Takács
 Lajos Börzsönyi
 Ambrus Balogh

50 metre pistol
 Ambrus Balogh
 Lajos Börzsönyi
 Sándor Tölgyesi

Swimming

Water polo

Weightlifting

Wrestling

Art competitions

References

External links
Official Olympic Reports
International Olympic Committee results database

Nations at the 1948 Summer Olympics
1948
1948 in Hungarian sport